Manolo Favis is a popular and veteran radio personality in the Philippines. He presently anchors Ito Ang Inyong Lingkod, Don Manolo, on Radyo La Verdad 1350 since September 2020.

Filmography

Film
Payaso (1986)

Radio
Dis is Manolo (Super Radyo DZBB 594) (1980–2020)
Ito Ang Inyong Lingkod, Don Manolo (Radyo La Verdad 1350) (2020–present)

See also
Super Radyo DZBB
GMA Network

External links
Super Radyo DZBB Anchors

Filipino radio journalists
Living people
Year of birth missing (living people)
Place of birth missing (living people)